Hit the Deck is a 1930 American pre-Code musical film directed by Luther Reed and starring Jack Oakie and Polly Walker, with Technicolor sequences.  It was based on the 1927 musical Hit the Deck, which was itself based on the 1922 play Shore Leave by Hubert Osborne. It was one of the most expensive productions of RKO Radio Pictures up to that time, and one of the most expensive productions of 1930. This version faithfully reproduced the stage version of the musical.

Plot
Looloo (Walker) runs a diner which is frequented with U.S. Navy sailors on shore leave, including officers.  Two officers, Admiral Smith (Henderson) and Lieutenant Allen (MacDonald) accompany a wealthy socialite, Mrs. Payne (Clayton), to the establishment.

Mrs. Payne is an heiress, and when she engages in conversation with Looloo, she expresses admiration for the necklace Looloo is wearing.  She offers to purchase it for a substantial sum, but it is a family heirloom and Looloo refuses.  Later, two sailors arrive at the diner, Bilge (Oakie) and Clarence (Ovey), looking for Lavinia, Clarence's sweetheart who has run away.  Bilge, is smitten with Looloo, and begins to romance her. Opening up to her, he reveals his desire to become the captain of his own ship after he leaves the navy.  Before things go too far, Bilge's shipmates drag him back to his ship, which is scheduled to set sail.

Based on her conversation with Bilge, Looloo decides to sell her necklace to Mrs. Payne, in order to get the funds necessary to buy a ship for Bilge.  When Bilge's ship docks once again, the two lovers are re-united, and Bilge proposes to Looloo, who happily accepts.  However, when she tells him about the money, and the plans she's made to help him buy his own ship, his pride makes him indignant and he storms off.  However, he later returns and the two agree to marry.

Cast
 Jack Oakie as Bilge
 Polly Walker as Looloo
 Roger Gray as Mat
 Franker Wood as Bat
 Harry Sweet as Bunny
 Marguerita Padula as Lavinia
 June Clyde as Toddy
 Wallace MacDonald as Lieutenant Allen
 George Ovey as Clarence
 Ethel Clayton as Mrs. Payne
 Nate D. Slott as Dan (as Nate Slott)
 Andy Clark as Dinty
 Dell Henderson as Admiral Smith
 Charles Sullivan as Lieutenant Jim Smith
 Grady Sutton as sailor (uncredited)

Songs
 "Sometimes I'm Happy" - words by Irving Caesar, music by Vincent Youmans; performed by Jack Oakie and Polly Walker 
 "Keepin' Myself for You" - words by Sidney Clare, music by Vincent Youmans; performed by Jack Oakie and Polly Walker 
 "An Armful of You" - words by Leo Robin and Clifford Grey, music by Vincent Youmans; performed by Marguerita Padula and chorus
 "Hallelujah" - words by Leo Robin and Clifford Grey, music by Vincent Youmans; performed by Marguerita Padula and chorus
 "Harbor of My Heart" - words by Leo Robin and Clifford Grey, music by Vincent Youmans; performed by Jack Oakie and chorus
 "Join the Navy" - words by Leo Robin and Clifford Grey, music by Vincent Youmans; performed by Jack Oakie and chorus
 "Nothing Could Be Sweeter" - words by Leo Robin and Clifford Grey, music by Vincent Youmans; performed by Jack Oakie and Polly Walker

Reception
The film made a profit of $145,000.  Mordaunt Hall, The New York Times critic, gave the film a lackluster review, writing that it "is anything but an inspired entertainment. Except for one or two sequences, the mixing of the story and spectacle doesn't jell. The fun is labored and the romance is more painful than sympathetic."

Other adaptations
The Broadway musical, Hit the Deck , on which this film is based was written by Herbert Fields, with music by Vincent Youmans, and lyrics by Leo Robin and Clifford Grey; it premiered in New York City on April 25, 1927.  That musical was based on an earlier play, Shore Leave, written by Hubert Osborne, which premiered in New York City on August 8, 1922. The play had been made into a silent film, also entitled Shore Leave, starring Richard Barthelmess and Dorothy Mackaill. Osborne's play would also be remade into another musical version, Follow the Fleet, in 1936, starring Fred Astaire and Ginger Rogers.

Preservation status
The film is considered a lost film. The last known copy was destroyed in an RKO fire in the 1950s.

See also
List of lost films
List of incomplete or partially lost films
List of early color feature films

References

External links

1930 films
1930 musical films
1930s color films
1930 lost films
American musical films
American films based on plays
Films about the United States Navy
Films based on musicals
Films based on adaptations
Lost American films
RKO Pictures films
Films directed by Luther Reed
1930s English-language films
1930s American films